Piraña is a river rapids ride in amusement park Efteling in the Netherlands. It was designed by Ton van de Ven, built by Intamin, and opened in 1983.

History and details
The ride is one of many attractions since the 80’s to diversify in more than just a fairy-tale park. House designer van de Ven took Intamin’s design, as implemented in Six Flags’s Roaring Rapids (Texas, amongst others) and expanded it into a pre-Columbian thematic ride. Original planned for 1982, the extensive architecture delayed the opening to 1983. As with earlier attractions, the entire landscape and service outlets in the area were remodeled to fit the unique design.

Ride length: 520 meters
Propulsion: four pumps rotating 10 million liters of water per hour
Maximum Speed: 20 km/h
Capacity: with 35 boats: 2000 visitors per hour
Cost: €7,25 million

First river rapids ride in Europe.

The ride
The ride starts with a descent through a dark tunnel, which opens up into a broad section of rapids in which the rafts can even overtake one another. The rafts then pass two waterfalls. In some cases the rafts line up in such a way that unlucky visitors will get a quick shower from the very edge of the falls. After this the river narrows. The area between the waterfalls offers visitors a chance to watch the boats go by. After the waterfalls there is a narrow passage with another overpass. In hot summers there will be a water jet from the wall to ensure that the boats will be splashed. The rapids get more intense throughout the ride, until it passes the narrow pass. After this pass it will drift between two waterfalls which are literally two walls of water. After passing the last waterfall the ride ends with more intense rapids. From the exit a walk can be made around the ride, using Inca rope bridges.

The ride is based on pre-Columbian cultures, whose styles can be found everywhere:
 The whole building is covered with chibcha decorations
 Square before the ride’s entrance: Chac-mool themed waste dispenser (Mayan/Toltec)
 Ride entrance: two giant Teotihuacan warrior atlantes.  Above the gate we see Quetzalcoatl (Mixtec, Toltec, Aztec). At the side of the entrance two typical Mayan heads are displayed.
 Boarding area: typical colorful Tahuantinsuyu banners, windows and oversized Tumis decorate this area.
 The ride: Tiwanaku Inca style walls can be seen at the beginning. Further on we see the Teotihuacan sungod Con-tici Viracocha, other Chavin animal-like decorations and a ceremonial figure conclude the ride.

External links
 Company information

Efteling
Water rides
River rapids rides
Water rides manufactured by Intamin
Amusement rides introduced in 1983